Alexandar Popovic (born 7 September 2002), is an Australian professional footballer who plays as a centre-back for Adelaide United.

Honours
Individual
A-Leagues All Stars Game: 2022

References

External links

2002 births
Living people
Australian soccer players
Soccer players from Adelaide
Association football defenders
Adelaide United FC players
National Premier Leagues players
A-League Men players